Nurzamin is a town belonging to Gurlan District, Khorezm Region, Republic of Uzbekistan. In 2009, it was given the status of a town.

References 

Populated places in Xorazm Region